The Porsche 981 is the internal designation given to the third-generation of the Boxster and second generation of the Cayman models built by German automobile manufacturer Porsche. It was announced on 13 March 2012 at the Geneva Auto Show with sales starting early summer 2012.

The 981 reflects the new design language from the 911 (991) and 918, and features revised engine and transmission specifications. There is a small weight reduction of up to  compared to the outgoing 987. The 981 was the first Boxster/Cayman to use electronically assisted steering, and the parking brake in the car uses an electronic linkage. The instrument cluster features a 4.6" TFT color screen in conjunction with various sensors that can display accurate engine temperature, oil temperature and oil pressure. The Sport Chrono Package includes dynamic gearbox mounts. Another new feature was the auto start/stop system.

It was succeeded by the Porsche 982.

Boxster
The standard Boxster is fitted with a new 2.7-litre flat-6 engine, and the Boxster S is fitted with the existing 3.4-litre engine but with revised performance. Both engines are equipped with a 6-speed manual gearbox and an optional 7-speed reworked PDK. Both manual and automatic models are available with several technical options including Porsche Torque Vectoring (PTV) and a Sport Chrono Package that includes active transmission mounts, and makes the PDK-equipped model even faster. Porsche claims that the new generation Boxster provides fuel savings of 15% over the outgoing model.

Boxster GTS 
The range was expanded in March 2014 with the addition of the GTS derivative, with slightly altered front and rear bumpers and an additional  from the 3.4-litre engine.

Boxster Spyder 
Porsche unveiled the latest Boxster Spyder based on the 981 Boxster in April 2015 at the New York Auto Show. The Spyder is a lightweight high performance version of the Boxster and the lightest Porsche in the model lineup at the time, weighing . The Spyder is only available with a 6 speed manual transmission. The styling of the car is similar to the previous generation Spyder, continuing the twin hump rear deck and manually operated canvas top. It also shares some styling with the Cayman GT4, using the same front and rear fascia. 

The Spyder's lightweight design was achieved through the use of aluminum doors and rear boot lid, a manually operated canvas soft top with electronic assist, and unique lightweight 20 inch wheels. The air conditioning and audio system were also removed, although they could be added as no cost options. Total weight savings amounted to  when compared to a manual-equipped Boxster GTS despite the Spyder's upsized engine and chassis upgrades.

The Spyder is the only model from the 981 generation to feature an updated faster ratio steering rack shared with 911 Turbo S for improved steering response and feel.  It is equipped with a smaller diameter GT steering wheel used in both the 911 GT3 and Cayman GT4. The Spyder's brakes are enlarged over other Boxster models, using six-piston calipers with 340 mm rotors at the front and four-piston calipers with 330 mm rotors at the rear shared with the 911 Carrera S. The Spyder features a sports suspension with 20mm lower ride height than the standard Boxster. A limited slip differential with Porsche Torque Vectoring shared with the Cayman GT4 was also used. 

Reception was positive with high marks for its lightweight chassis and handling balance. Some reviewers preferred the Boxster Spyder’s chassis setup to the Cayman GT4’s, even if the latter has more ultimate grip. The Spyder was a limited-production model with 2,486 units in total made with 829 of those destined for North America.

Boxster Bergspyder 

In 2019, Porsche revealed that in 2015, the executive board commissioned a project group from Weissach to build a sports car based on the 981, that was to be as light and minimalist as possible. 50 years ago, Porsche's engineers had built a car using similar constraints: the Porsche 909 Bergspyder. The 981 Bergspyder never entered production as it failed feasibility tests.

Specifications

Cayman

The second generation Cayman was unveiled at the 2012 Geneva Motor Show. The production version was introduced as a 2014 model in the spring of 2013. The new car was available in both the standard trim with a 2.7-litre engine, and in the S trim with a 3.4-litre engine. Both versions were available with either a 6-speed manual or a dual-clutch 7-speed PDK transmission.

The 981 features upgrades including a new body, a longer wheelbase, a wider front track, and a redesigned interior that matches the firm's contemporary 911 models.

The new model gained acclaim in the motoring press as one of the best handling sports cars at any price, due to its-mid engine layout and driving dynamics. The Cayman S benefitted from the same engine and running gear as Porsche's latest 3.4-litre version of the 911.

Cayman GTS

The Cayman GTS was introduced in 2014, and is based on the 981 platform. It featured a marginally more powerful engine, a new body kit, new 20-inch Carrera S wheels, new Bi-Xenon headlights, and a new sports exhaust system. The Cayman GTS is longer than the Cayman and the Cayman S by  due to its bumpers. The new, optional passive sport suspension allows the Cayman GTS to have a 20 mm lower ride height compared to the Cayman equipped with standard passive suspension or 10 mm lower compared to one with the standard-equipped PASM. The Cayman GTS weighs  with the manual transmission and can attain a top speed of  while the Cayman GTS with PDK can reach  and weighs . The configuration changes made over a standard Cayman S resemble closely what Porsche did to its predecessors through Cayman S Sport and Cayman R in the 987 generation models.

Cayman GT4

It has a vented front bumper to improve cooling for the additional radiator, with a lower lip spoiler as well as a fixed rear wing for providing downforce. Compared to the standard Cayman, it features a 30 mm lower ride height, upgraded brakes from the 991 GT3, a limited slip differential combined with Porsche Torque Vectoring, and Porsche Active Suspension Management with dampers derived from the 991 GT3. A number of reinforcements were also made throughout the chassis to keep it stiff and well balanced. A Club Sport Package is also available, featuring a rear half rollcage, preparation for a battery cut off switch, a fire extinguisher and a six-point racing harness for the driver, compatible with a neck saving HANS device. Sport Chrono Package with unique Track Precision app is also available specifically for the GT4, adding an additional ECU to the car to deliver telemetry data to the driver's smartphone.
In the United Kingdom, the GT4 could be ordered before its introduction at the 2015 Geneva Motor Show in March, and the first cars would arrive in dealerships in March.
The GT4 has gained rave reviews from magazines like Evo and the likes of Chris Harris.

Cayman GT4 Clubsport

On 6 October 2015, Porsche announced a racing version of the Cayman GT4 called the Cayman GT4 Clubsport. Developed by Porsche Motorsport, the Cayman GT4 Clubsport made its debut at the 2015 LA Auto Show in November.

As opposed to the road going Cayman GT4, the Clubsport version is fitted with Porsche's PDK double clutch transmission (albeit with the 7th gear disabled) with shift paddles on the steering wheel, as well as mechanical rear-axle locking differential. The Cayman GT4 Clubsport weighs  and shares the same Performance Friction brakes and lightweight suspension strut front axle found on the Porsche 991 GT3 Cup. Its ABS is adjustable in 12 steps. A 100-litre FIA-approved "bag" fuel tank is available as an option for endurance racing. In addition to its lightweight features, it is supplied fitted with an FIA welded-in roll-cage, six-point harness and racing bucket seats.

Sales of the new Cayman GT4 Clubsport commenced after its debut in November through Porsche Motorsport in Weissach or Porsche Motorsport North America.

Specifications

References

981
Cars powered by boxer engines
Rear mid-engine, rear-wheel-drive vehicles
Coupés
Roadsters
Cars introduced in 2012